Atsuhiko (written: 篤彦 or 敦彦) is a masculine Japanese given name. Notable people with the name include:

, Japanese footballer
, Japanese footballer
, Japanese classical scholar

Japanese masculine given names